Alexandre Henrard (born 11 July 1992) is a French modern pentathlete.

He participated at the 2018 World Modern Pentathlon Championships, winning a medal.

References

External links

Living people
1992 births
French male modern pentathletes
World Modern Pentathlon Championships medalists
People from Coutances
Sportspeople from Manche
21st-century French people